The Missionary Society of St. James the Apostle, founded by Cardinal Richard Cushing in 1958, is an international organization of diocesan missionary priests who volunteer a minimum of five years of their priestly lives to service in Peru, Bolivia and Ecuador. They were established by Cushing in response to the call by Pope John XXIII for members of the Catholic Church in economically favored nations to assist their fellow Catholics in Latin America.

Based in Boston, they are not a religious order, but an organization which facilitates a temporary period of service (usually five years) by Roman Catholic clergy. After this period, most members return to their home diocese, though some remain committed to serve in the work of the Society.

While on mission, they make themselves available for work in remote, rural parishes or in urban ones, where the limited resources of the local Church make serving the local inhabitants difficult.

The Society acts under the protection of Cardinal Sean Patrick O'Malley, O.F.M. Cap., the current archbishop of Boston.
In 2008 Fr. David Costello from Limerick in Ireland, was elected Superior of the Society in Peru, is a director of the society.

References

External links
 The Missionary Society of St. James the Apostle website

Catholic Church in Central America
Catholic missions
Catholic Church in South America